Jazz Sabbath is a fictional English jazz trio said to be from the late sixties. The band was created by Adam Wakeman, touring keyboard and guitar player for Black Sabbath (2004–2017) and Ozzy Osbourne band member (2004–present). Jazz Sabbath plays jazz renditions of Black Sabbath songs, claiming to be the original writers of those songs and accusing Black Sabbath of plagiarism.

The band first appeared in a mockumentary on YouTube in February 2020. In this short film band leader Milton Keanes (Adam Wakeman) was interviewed by actor Robert Powell about the early days of Jazz Sabbath, their cancelled debut album and the alleged theft of their songs by Black Sabbath. This album was later released as an actual album on 10 April 2020.

History 
The idea for Jazz Sabbath started in 2013 on a night off in Berlin during one of the Black Sabbath tours, when Adam and Sabbath's security guard sat at the hotel bar early in the morning. The security guard asked if Adam could play the Sabbath set on the piano in the bar. Adam thought it would be fun to play the songs as jazz improvised versions and then played until the bar staff wanted to go home.

Discography 

Jazz Sabbath (2020) 
Released through Blacklake Records on 10 April 2020, the album contains jazz renditions of "Fairies Wear Boots", "Evil Woman", "Rat Salad", "Iron Man", "Hand of Doom", "Changes" and "Children of the Grave".

Personnel: In the album liner notes, the band members and session players are only mentioned by their fictional names:
 Milton Keanes – piano (Adam Wakeman)
 Jacque T'fono – upright bass (Jerry Meehan)
 Juan Také – drums (Ash Soan)

Album session players:
Wes Tostrayer – Guitar (Pete Rinaldi),
Steven Stringer – Guitar (Simon McBride),
Chester Drawes– Guitar (Fraser T. Smith),
Leighton B'zard – Hammond Organ (Adam Wakeman), and Fenton Breezley – Saxophone (Justin Swadling)

On the iTunes jazz charts the album debuted on #4 in the UK, #3 in the US and #1 in Canada.
The album peaked at #14 on the Official Jazz & Blues Albums Chart Top 30 and at #25 on the Billboard Jazz Albums Chart.

A mono edition of the album was released only in record stores on Record Store Day Black Friday, 27 November 2020.
This RSD edition is pressed on blue transparent vinyl and includes the bonus track ‘Iron Man (Live in London 1968)’ plus a bonus DVD with the Jazz Sabbath documentary.
The live bonus track was later released on digital/streaming platforms on International Jazz Day, 30 April 2021.

Jazz Sabbath Vol. 2 (2022) 
Jazz Sabbath Vol. 2 was released on 22 April 2022. 
The album contains jazz renditions of: "Paranoid", "Snowblind", "Behind the Wall of Sleep", "Sabbra Cadabra", "Symptom of the Universe", "N.I.B." and "Black Sabbath".
The album entered the iTunes jazz charts on #1 in the UK, the US and Canada and at #6 on the Billboard Jazz Albums Chart.

A mono edition of Vol. 2 was released as part of Record Store Day on 23 April 2022. This edition was pressed on translucent natural vinyl and included the bonus track 'Orchid' and a bonus DVD

References

External links 
 Official website
 Jazz Sabbath: The Documentary

Fictional musical groups
English jazz ensembles